Zsolt Baló (born 21 October 1971) is a Romanian speed skater. He competed at the 1992 Winter Olympics and the 1994 Winter Olympics, representing Romania. He then represented Hungary at the 1998 Winter Olympics and the 2002 Winter Olympics.

References

1971 births
Living people
Romanian male speed skaters
Hungarian male speed skaters
Olympic speed skaters of Romania
Olympic speed skaters of Hungary
Speed skaters at the 1992 Winter Olympics
Speed skaters at the 1994 Winter Olympics
Speed skaters at the 1998 Winter Olympics
Speed skaters at the 2002 Winter Olympics
Sportspeople from Miercurea Ciuc

Romanian sportspeople of Hungarian descent